Los Baños Creek or Los Banos Creek, originally El Arroyo de los Baños, is a tributary stream of the San Joaquin River.  Its source drains the slopes of the Diablo Range within the Central Valley of California, United States.  Los Baños Creek has its source at the confluence of North Fork Los Banos Creek and South Fork Los Banos Creek.  It flows northeast to the west edge of Los Banos and then north to Mud Slough 2.5 miles (4 km) upstream from its confluence with the San Joaquin River.

History
Los Baños Creek is reported to have taken its name from the pools, near its head, called Los Baños de Padre Arroyo for Padre Felipe Arroyo de la Cuesta, who was at Mission San Juan Bautista from 1808 to 1833 and conducted proselytizing missions into the San Joaquin Valley.  El Arroyo de los Baños was a watering place on El Camino Viejo in the San Joaquin Valley between Arroyo de Quinto and Arroyo de San Luis Gonzaga.

Los Baños de Padre Arroyo is registered as California Historical Landmark #550.

References

Tributaries of the San Joaquin River
Rivers of Merced County, California
El Camino Viejo
Rivers of Northern California